Fred Small may refer to:

Fred Small (singer-songwriter) (born 1952), American singer-songwriter
Fred Small (American football) (1963–2003), American football player

See also
Frederick Small (died 1918), convicted murderer
Fred Smalls (born 1963), former American football linebacker
S. Frederick Small, better known as Daddy Freddy( born 1965), Jamaican ragga vocalist